The RCC Marching Tigers or "Hollywood's Band" is the marching band of Riverside City College. The band has appeared in parades such as the Tournament of Roses Parade, Fiesta Bowl Parade, the Hollywood Christmas Parade, the Macy's Thanksgiving Day Parade, various athletic events, Bands of America Grand Nationals in exhibition, as well as appearances in television shows, commercials, music videos, and movies. They are also well known internationally and have toured around the world.

History
The RCC Marching Tigers started in 1984 by director Gary Locke. They have since grown into one of the most prominent and talented college marching bands in the world. The Tigers were formerly a competitive marching band, but eventually moved on to bigger projects after placing first in every competition they competed in for eleven years in a row. They are now a well known exhibition band, performing at many WBA and Bands of America Grand National competitions and appearing in many motion pictures, television shows, television commercials, and other events.

Around the World

On Screen
The RCC Marching Tigers have appeared in many major motion pictures, television shows, and television commercials, as well as music videos. They got their start in the entertainment industry in 1990 with their first television appearance in the Pasadena Tournament of Roses Parade. Shortly after, the Riverside Auto Center wanted to advertise their local business and hired the Marching Tigers and the RCC Pep Squad to be part of a huge television media campaign. The television commercials appeared on local Public-access television cable TV and then on ESPN. It is this exposure on ESPN that helped the Tigers gain media prominence and push them into the entertainment industry.

Since then, the RCC Marching Tigers' entertainment repertoire has been steadily growing.

External links
RCC Marching Tigers

College marching bands in the United States
Musical groups established in 1984
1984 establishments in California
Musical groups from Riverside County, California